The High Commissioner of the Republic in New Caledonia is the representative of the French Republic in New Caledonia. with the rank of prefect, generally referred to locally in the media as "Haussaire". Its competences since the Nouméa agreement of 1998 and the organic law on New Caledonia of 1999 have been reduced. The part of the organic law which regulates the position of High Commissioner is Title VI.

He is “appointed by decree of the president of France deliberated in the Council of Ministers. He publishes the laws of the country with the countersignature of the president of the government of New Caledonia . He ensures their publication, as well as any administrative regulations, in the official journal. He chairs the Mining Council. It is responsible for the organization of services falling within the regal powers of the State: in particular security and justice. It is also he who manages the crisis cells linked to climatic events, such as cyclones. He attends by right the Committee of signatories of the Nouméa agreement and acts as the guarantor.

The High Commissioner has been known by other titles since New Caledonia was taken over by France in 1853, first  by the title of Commander from 1853 to 1860 , then by Governor from 1860 to 1981 (who also bore the title of Commissioner General of the French Republic in the Pacific Ocean from 28 February 1901 and  High Commissioner of France for the New Hebrides Archipelago from 11 January 1907, these two positions being held by the Governor until 1981.

List of officeholders

(Dates in italics indicate de facto continuation of office)

See also
 Politics of New Caledonia
 History of New Caledonia

External links
 World Statesmen.org: New Caledonia

New Caledonia
New Caledonia-related lists
Government of New Caledonia
History of New Caledonia